Calico Mountains may refer to:
Calico Mountains (California)
Calico Mountains (Nevada)
Calico Mountains Wilderness in Nevada